Montserrado-12 is an electoral district for the elections to the House of Representatives of Liberia. The district covers 8 communities of the Gardnersville township; Chicken Soup Factory, Shoe Factory, Stephen Tolbert Estate, River View, MTA, Kesselly Boulevard, Mangrove Island and J.J.Y.-Snow Hill and well as the Johnsonville Road A community of the Barnersville township.

Elected representatives

References

Electoral districts in Liberia